Omoglymmius javanicus is a species of beetle in the subfamily Rhysodidae. It was described by Grouvelle in 1903.

References

javanicus
Beetles described in 1903